Swanton Novers Woods is an  biological Site of Special Scientific Interest east of Fakenham in Norfolk. The site is composed of Swanton Great Wood, Little Wood, Barney Wood and Guybon's Wood. It is a Nature Conservation Review site, Grade I. Swanton Great Wood and Little Wood are designated Swanton Novers National Nature Reserve

These ancient woods are almost certainly of primary origin, and they are regarded as one of the most important groups of woods in the country. The trees and ground flora are exceptionally diverse, and they include the nationally rare may lily.

The site is currently closed to the public although the main public footpaths are still accessible.

References

Sites of Special Scientific Interest in Norfolk
National nature reserves in England
Nature Conservation Review sites